Jean Wadoux (born 29 January 1942) is a retired French middle-distance runner. He competed at the 1964 Summer Olympics in 1500 m and at the 1968 Summer Olympics in 5000 m and finished in ninth place on both occasions. On 23 July 1970 he set a European record in 1500 m, and next year won a European silver medal in 5000 m.

Wadoux is a former world record holder in the seldom contested 4 × 1500 metres relay, with 14:49.0 minutes in June 1965. His teammates were Michel Jazy, Claude Nicolas and Gérard Vervoort.

References

1942 births
Living people
Sportspeople from Pas-de-Calais
French male middle-distance runners
French male long-distance runners
Olympic male middle-distance runners
Olympic male long-distance runners
Olympic athletes of France
Athletes (track and field) at the 1964 Summer Olympics
Athletes (track and field) at the 1968 Summer Olympics
Mediterranean Games gold medalists for France
Mediterranean Games medalists in athletics
Athletes (track and field) at the 1963 Mediterranean Games
European Athletics Championships medalists
Japan Championships in Athletics winners
World record setters in athletics (track and field)